Breandán Mac Cionnaith is an Irish politician and a prominent residents' group leader. He is a member of Éirígí, a socialist republican party. He used to be  an adviser to Sinn Féin members of the Northern Ireland Assembly. He came to prominence in the 1990s as the spokesman for the Garvaghy Road Residents' Coalition (also known as the Garvaghy Road Residents' Association). In the early 1980s, Mac Cionnaith was jailed for six years for his involvement in the IRA bombing of Portadown's town centre.

Garvaghy stand-off
From 1997, Mac Cionnaith was the spokesman for the Garvaghy Road residents in the Drumcree conflict, which centres on the desire of the Orange Order to walk a traditional route through an area that had become predominantly Roman Catholic. In 1997 he was elected to Craigavon Borough Council for the Portadown area and sat on the council until 2001

Prior to 2002, Mac Cionnaith had received death threats and a live bullet had been sent to him.

Other activity
On 10 April 2007, Mac Cionnaith resigned from Sinn Féin, soon after the party decided to support the Police Service of Northern Ireland (PSNI) and after an unsuccessful attempt to secure the party's nomination for the Northern Ireland Assembly elections. Mac Cionnaith continues to serve as spokesman for the Garvaghy Road Residents Coalition and, in February 2010, he helped formulate a joint submission to the Northern Ireland Assembly's Working Party on Parading Issues.

Mac Cionnaith has been critical of the Orange Institution and of the Royal Ulster Constabulary (since replaced by the PSNI). Mac Cionnaith is also a prominent campaigner for an inquiry into the murder of solicitor Rosemary Nelson.

Mac Cionnaith joined the socialist republican political party Éirígí, and was elected General Secretary of the organisation in May 2009.

References

1950s births
Members of Craigavon Borough Council
Irish republicans
Irish socialists
Living people
Activists from Northern Ireland
People from County Armagh
People from Portadown
Sinn Féin politicians
Irish republicans imprisoned on charges of terrorism
Provisional Irish Republican Army members